The New River Gorge Bridge is a steel arch bridge  long over the New River Gorge near Fayetteville, West Virginia, in the Appalachian Mountains of the eastern United States. Part of U.S. Route 19, its construction marked the completion of Corridor L of the Appalachian Development Highway System. An average of 16,200 motor vehicles cross the bridge each day.

When completed in 1977, it was the world's highest bridge carrying a regular roadway, a title it held until the 2001 opening of the Liuguanghe Bridge in China. Because of its height, the bridge has attracted daredevils since its construction. It is now the centerpiece of the annual "Bridge Day", during which hundreds of people, with appropriate equipment, are permitted to climb on or jump from the bridge. In 2005, the structure gained additional attention when the US Mint issued the West Virginia state quarter with the bridge depicted on one side. In 2013, the bridge was listed on the National Register of Historic Places.

History

Construction began on the bridge in June 1974, and was completed on October 22, 1977. The bridge was designed by the Michael Baker Company under the direction of Chief Engineer Clarence V. Knudsen and Corporate Bridge Engineer Frank J. Kempf, and executed by U.S. Steel's American Bridge Division. The final cost of construction was $37 million (equivalent to $ million in  dollars). It was approximately $4 million, or $ million in  dollars, over bid. It is made from COR-TEN steel. The use of COR-TEN in construction presented several challenges; notable among them was ensuring that the weld points weathered at the same rate as the rest of the steel.

At the time, the bridge was the West Virginia Department of Highways' largest project in its history, important both in terms of its overall cost, and that the federal government provided 70 percent of the funding. Construction gave a boost to the state and local economy; completion improved transportation. The bridge cut the vehicle travel time from one side of the gorge to the other from about 45 minutes to 45 seconds.

On August 14, 2013, the bridge was listed on the National Register of Historic Places. Even though it was not yet 50 years old, it was listed for its exceptional impact on local transportation and its engineering significance.

Tourism

The New River Gorge Bridge is within the National Park Service's New River Gorge National Park and Preserve, which protects this portion of the New River Gorge. At the northern end of the bridge, the Park Service operates a visitor center; it has scenic overlooks and a staircase that descends part of the way into the gorge.

A steel catwalk two feet (60 cm) wide runs the full length of the bridge underneath the roadway.  Originally built to facilitate inspections, the catwalk is open for guided, handicapped-accessible quarter-mile "Bridge Walk" tours; visitors use safety rigging.

Since its opening, the bridge has been the centerpiece of Fayette County's "Bridge Day",  held the third Saturday of every October. This festival includes demonstrations of rappelling, ascending, and BASE jumping.  Bungee jumping, however, has been banned during Bridge Day since 1993.

The bridge is closed to vehicular traffic during the festival. Prior to the September 11 terrorist attacks, two of the bridge's four lanes were open to traffic during the festivals. Since 2001, security concerns have caused the entire span to be closed to vehicles during these events.

The first person to jump off the New River Gorge Bridge was Burton Ervin, who lives in Cowen, West Virginia, and was a coal-mine foreman. Burton jumped on August 1, 1979, using a conventional parachute.  Four BASE jumpers have died at the bridge, three of these during Bridge Day festivals.

Probably because of its height (and lack of barriers), the bridge has regularly attracted suicide jumpers.

Gallery

See also

 50 State Quarters
 List of bridges documented by the Historic American Engineering Record in West Virginia
 List of bridges in the United States by height
 List of bridges on the National Register of Historic Places in West Virginia
 List of highest bridges
 List of suicide sites
 Midland Trail, a nearby National Scenic Byway
 National Register of Historic Places listings in Fayette County, West Virginia
 New River Gorge National Park and Preserve, the park surrounding the bridge

References and notes

External links

Bridge Day (official site)
Bridge Day History
New River Gorge Bridge at Bridges & Tunnels
New River Gorge Bridge at Roads to the Future
New River Gorge Bridge at HighestBridges.com

U.S. Route 19
Bridges completed in 1977
Transportation in Fayette County, West Virginia
Landmarks in West Virginia
Buildings and structures in Fayette County, West Virginia
Tourist attractions in Fayette County, West Virginia
Weathering steel
Historic American Engineering Record in West Virginia
Bridges of the United States Numbered Highway System
Road bridges on the National Register of Historic Places in West Virginia
National Register of Historic Places in Fayette County, West Virginia
Steel bridges in the United States
Truss arch bridges in the United States
National Register of Historic Places in New River Gorge National Park and Preserve